Thirumathi Selvam (Mrs. Selvam) is a 2007 Tamil television soap opera directed by S. Kumaran and produced by Radhika Srinivasan & B. Srinivasan for Vikatan Televistas. It Stars Sanjeev and Abitha in the lead roles with Rindhya, Gautami and Vadivukkarasi played supporting roles. It premiered on 5 November 2007 and initially aired weekday afternoons on Sun TV, before being moved to prime time on 17 November 2008. The serial ended on 22 March 2013 with 1360 episodes. Thirumathi Selvam is currently re-airing on Kalaignar TV at 09:00PM from 29 March 2021 onwards.

The story revolved around the lead character Selvam and showed how his good qualities, hard work, and love for his wife Archana, and care for his best friend Nandhini, and how that made him reach great heights. Then, it showed how money, fame, and power led to his downfall.

The serial was remade in Hindi as Pavitra Rishta under Balaji Telefilms and it was aired on Zee TV.

Plot
The story is about Selvam who is a master mechanic by profession. He decides not to get married because he works hard yet struggles for the welfare of his family being the sole breadwinner. He gives up his studies to educate his younger brother and sister. However, fate takes a turn when he falls in love with Archana after seeing her at a temple. Archana is a wise, hardworking, and kind woman. Archana is uneducated as she has only studied until tenth grade and was forced to halt her studies due to the deteriorating health of her mother. Thus, Archana become the favourite for her parents among the sisters.  For his marriage proposal, he is compelled to tell a lie that he is a mechanical engineer, since Archana's mother, Sivagami, was determined to marry her daughter to an educated man. After the marriage, the truth comes to light, and Archana begins to hate Selvam for concealing the fact that he isn't educated and is a mechanic. She initially refuses to live with him but eventually understands Selvam's love for her and goodness in his character and decides to reconcile her relationship with him. Over time, Selvam is cheated by his stepmother Bagyam to whom he loses his house and the mechanic shed he owned. With no place to go, the couple are forced to sleep in the platform and are rescued by Selvam's friend Siva. Nandhinee one of Selvam's other friends helps him and Archana in their misery and helps to enhance their living standards. Slowly and surely, with his hard work and Archana and Nandhinee's guidance, Selvam becomes rich, grows to the status of Car Dealers Association Chairman. The couple now move to a bungalow.

Nandhinee decides to separate Selvam and Archana to seek revenge on Archana's mother Sivagami for doubting her relationship with Selvam and insulting her in front of her neighbours. She succeeds in separating Selvam from Archana by making Selvam a drunkard go against Archana losing all his good morals which he cherished from his childhood and his love for Archana. Selvam even goes to the extent of chasing Archana out of his house. Archana challenges Selvam: Nandhini will neglect him, and she will not forgive him then. Thereafter, Selvam becomes boastful and too possessive with money. But Selvam discovers Nandhinee's true colors and her intention behind separating Archana from him for which he quarrels with Nandhinee. In the process, Selvam pushes Nandhinee and she dies by falling from the terrace. Selvam is accused for Nandhinee's death, and the court gives him imprisonment for an year. After his return from prison, Selvam begs for forgiveness to Archana, but Archana, with a torn heart by being betrayed by Selvam, could neither forgive him nor accept his reformation. The story ends as an anti-climax: Selvam and Archana are separated for rest the of their life and Selvam loses all his wealth landing in the same platform worrying about his fate. The story ends with a note stating Live, let live, live properly.

Cast

Main
Sanjeev Venkat as  Selvam - a mechanic, He loved his wife Archana and respected his best friend Nandhini. But soon he completely changed into ruthless, and he lost all his wealth and family and betrayed his own family and his friend.
Abitha as Archana - Selvam's wife.
Rindhya (2007-2009;2012-2013) as Nandhini 
 Selvam's best friend since childhood. Initially she one-sidedly loved him but changed after he married Archana, she helped them economically and cared for them. (Epi 1-1116)
 But she later turned into an antagonist. (Epi 1117-1356) (Died in the serial)
 Latha Rao (2010-2011) as (Temporarily Replaced Rindhya's role as Nandhini)

Supporting
K. R. Vatsala (2007-2008) → Gowthami Vembunathan (2008-2013) as Mangala Bhagyalakshmi "Bhagyam", Selvam's foster mother (Main Antagonist) (Died in serial).
Vadivukkarasi as Sivagami, Archana 's mother (Died. Killed in Bomb Blast).
Vizhuthugal Santhanam as Sivaramakrishnan a.k.a. Sivaraman, Archana 's father (Died)
V C Jeyamani as  Dr Poongavanam; Selvam's foster father, Vasu and Rani's father

Recurring
Ceylon Manohar as Rangarajan, Nandhini's father, Selvam's well-wisher (Died)
Tinku (2007-2012) → Dev Anand Sharma (2012-2013) as Vasu - Selvam's foster younger brother, Revathy's husband.
Deepak Dinkar as Cherian aka Cherry, Kavya's husband (Antagonist) (Jailed) 
Ragavi as Jayanthi, Archana's sister-in-law.
Supergood Kannan as Karunai Kumar, Archana's wellwisher, owner of Karunai Illam orphanage.
Peeli Sivam as Narayanan (Periyavar), Poongavanam's elder brother, Selvam's father (Died)
Birla Bose as Vinothkumar "Vinoth" Sivaraman, Archana's brother
Kavitha (2007-2010) → Shivani (2010–2013) as  Kavya "Kavya" Sorimuthu Aiyanaar; Cherry's wife, Archana's sister
Archana (2007-2010) → Kavya Varshini Arun (2010-2012) as Priya Dina, Archana's younger sister, Dina's ex-love interest (Died. Killed by Cherry)
Aparna as Rani, Selvam's foster younger sister
Sakthi Saravanan as Akash 
Soori as Amirtham, Selvam's assistant
Swapna as Revathy Vasudevan, Vasu's wife, Rajashekar's daughter
Vijay Anand as  Dinakaran "Dheena", Chinthamani's son, Jayanthi's elder brother (Antagonist)
Priya as Chinthamani, Jayanthi and Dina's mother (Antagonist)
Satish (2008-2011) → Arvind Khatare (2011-2013) as Chezhiyan "Chezhiyan", Nandhini's ex-husband
Shravan as Dileepan, Kavya's ex-love interest
Ramachandran Mahalingam as Rajashekar, Revathy's father
Akila as Bhanumathi Shekhar, Archana and Selvam's old neighbour and wellwisher
Apsara as Kavitha, Jayanthi's colleague
Golden Suresh as Madhan Lal Seth 
Sheela as Parvathi, Karunai's mother
Lenin as Raj Kumar, Karunai's father
Venkat as Ranjith Kumar
Sreedhar as Chandrashekar "Shekar", Bhanu's husband, Archana and Selvam's old neighbour
Baby Harini as Ramya, Jayanthi and Vinodh's daughter
Laxmi Rattan as Sushil Kumar, Selvam's business partner
CN.Ravi Shankar as Muthu kumar
T . Rajeswari as Dileepan's mother
Sri Latha as Akash and Saroja's mother
Ganesh Babu as Saroja's husband and Akash's brother-in-law

Soundtrack
Title song was composed by music director D. Imman and sung by Shweta Mohan. Other songs were composed by music director Kiran.

.

Awards and honours

Adaptations

Crossover

Thirumathi Selvam had a crossover with Thendral as a special episode on 1 May 2011.

References

External links

Sun TV original programming
2000s Tamil-language television series
2007 Tamil-language television series debuts
Tamil-language television shows
2013 Tamil-language television series endings